The Copernican Revolution was the paradigm shift from the Ptolemaic model of the heavens, which described the cosmos as having Earth stationary at the center of the universe, to the heliocentric model with the Sun at the center of the Solar System. This revolution consisted of two phases; the first being extremely mathematical in nature and the second phase starting in 1610 with the publication of a pamphlet by Galileo. Beginning with the publication of Nicolaus Copernicus’s De revolutionibus orbium coelestium, contributions to the “revolution” continued until finally ending with Isaac Newton’s work over a century later.

Heliocentrism

Before Copernicus

The "Copernican Revolution" is named for Nicolaus Copernicus, whose Commentariolus, written before 1514, was the first explicit presentation of the heliocentric model in Renaissance scholarship. 
The idea of heliocentrism is much older; it can be traced to Aristarchus of Samos, a Hellenistic author writing in the 3rd century BC, who may in turn have been drawing on even older concepts in Pythagoreanism. Ancient heliocentrism was, however, eclipsed by the geocentric model presented by Ptolemy in the Almagest and accepted in Aristotelianism.

European scholars were well aware of the problems with Ptolemaic astronomy since the 13th century. The debate was precipitated by the reception by Averroes' criticism of Ptolemy, and it was again revived by the recovery of Ptolemy's text and its translation into Latin in the mid-15th century. Otto E. Neugebauer in 1957 argued that the debate in 15th-century Latin scholarship must also have been informed by the criticism of Ptolemy produced after Averroes, by the Ilkhanid-era (13th to 14th centuries) Persian school of astronomy associated with the 
Maragheh observatory (especially the works of Al-Urdi, Al-Tusi and Ibn al-Shatir).

The state of the question as received by Copernicus is summarized in the  Theoricae novae planetarum by  Georg von Peuerbach, compiled from lecture notes by Peuerbach's student Regiomontanus in 1454 but printed only in 1472.
Peuerbach attempts to give a new, mathematically more elegant presentation of Ptolemy's system, but he does not arrive at heliocentrism. 
Regiomontanus himself was the teacher of Domenico Maria Novara da Ferrara, who was in turn the teacher of Copernicus.

There is a possibility that Regiomontanus already arrived at a theory of heliocentrism before his death in 1476, as he paid particular attention to the heliocentric theory of Aristarchus in a later work, and mentions the "motion of the Earth" in a letter.

Nicolaus Copernicus

Copernicus studied at Bologna University during 1496–1501, where he became the assistant of Domenico Maria Novara da Ferrara. He is known to have studied the Epitome in Almagestum Ptolemei by Peuerbach and Regiomontanus (printed in Venice in 1496) and to have performed observations of lunar motions on 9 March 1497. Copernicus went on to develop an explicitly heliocentric model of planetary motion, at first written in his short work Commentariolus some time before 1514, circulated in a limited number of copies among his acquaintances. He continued to refine his system until publishing his larger work, De revolutionibus orbium coelestium (1543), which contained detailed diagrams and tables.

The Copernican model makes the claim of describing the physical reality of the cosmos, something which the Ptolemaic model was no longer believed to be able to provide.
Copernicus removed Earth from the center of the universe, set the heavenly bodies in rotation around the Sun, and introduced Earth's daily rotation on its axis. While Copernicus's work sparked the "Copernican Revolution", it did not mark its end. In fact, Copernicus's own system had multiple shortcomings that would have to be amended by later astronomers.

Copernicus did not only come up with a theory regarding the nature of the sun in relation to the earth, but thoroughly worked to debunk some of the minor details within the geocentric theory. In his article about heliocentrism as a model, author Owen Gingerich writes that in order to persuade people of the accuracy of his model, Copernicus created a mechanism in order to return the description of celestial motion to a “pure combination of circles.” Copernicus’s theories made a lot of people uncomfortable and somewhat upset. Even with the scrutiny that he faced regarding his conjecture that the universe was not centered around the Earth, he continued to gain support- other scientists and astrologists even posited that his system allowed a better understanding of astronomy concepts than did the geocentric theory.

Reception

Tycho Brahe

Tycho Brahe (1546–1601) was a Danish nobleman who was well known as an astronomer in his time. Further advancement in the understanding of the cosmos would require new, more accurate observations than those that Nicolaus Copernicus relied on and Tycho made great strides in this area. Tycho formulated a geoheliocentrism, meaning the Sun moved around the Earth while the planets orbited the Sun, known as the Tychonic system. Although Tycho appreciated the advantages of Copernicus's system, he like many others could not accept the movement of the Earth.

In 1572, Tycho Brahe observed a new star in the constellation Cassiopeia. For eighteen months, it shone brightly in the sky with no visible parallax, indicating it was part of the heavenly region of stars according to Aristotle's model. However, according to that model, no change could take place in the heavens so Tycho's observation was a major discredit to Aristotle's theories. In 1577, Tycho observed a great comet in the sky. Based on his parallax observations, the comet passed through the region of the planets. According to Aristotelian theory, only uniform circular motion on solid spheres existed in this region, making it impossible for a comet to enter this region. Tycho concluded there were no such spheres, raising the question of what kept a planet in orbit.

With the patronage of the King of Denmark, Tycho Brahe established Uraniborg, an observatory in Hven. For 20 years, Tycho and his team of astronomers compiled astronomical observations that were vastly more accurate than those made before. These observations would prove vital in future astronomical breakthroughs.

Johannes Kepler

Kepler found employment as an assistant to Tycho Brahe and, upon Brahe's unexpected death, replaced him as imperial mathematician of Emperor Rudolph II. He was then able to use Brahe's extensive observations to make remarkable breakthroughs in astronomy, such as the three laws of planetary motion. Kepler would not have been able to produce his laws without the observations of Tycho, because they allowed Kepler to prove that planets traveled in ellipses, and that the Sun does not sit directly in the center of an orbit but at a focus. Galileo Galilei came after Kepler and developed his own telescope with enough magnification to allow him to study Venus and discover that it has phases like a moon. The discovery of the phases of Venus was one of the more influential reasons for the transition from geocentrism to heliocentrism. Sir Isaac Newton's Philosophiæ Naturalis Principia Mathematica concluded the Copernican Revolution. The development of his laws of planetary motion and universal gravitation explained the presumed motion related to the heavens by asserting a gravitational force of attraction between two objects.

In 1596, Kepler published his first book, the Mysterium Cosmographicum, which was the second (after Thomas Digges, in 1576) to endorse Copernican cosmology by an astronomer since 1540. The book described his model that used Pythagorean mathematics and the five Platonic solids to explain the number of planets, their proportions, and their order. The book garnered enough respect from Tycho Brahe to invite Kepler to Prague and serve as his assistant.

In 1600, Kepler set to work on the orbit of Mars, the second most eccentric of the six planets known at that time. This work was the basis of his next book, the Astronomia nova, which he published in 1609. The book argued heliocentrism and ellipses for planetary orbits instead of circles modified by epicycles. This book contains the first two of his eponymous three laws of planetary motion. In 1619, Kepler published his third and final law which showed the relationship between two planets instead of single planet movement.

Kepler's work in astronomy was new in part. Unlike those who came before him, he discarded the assumption that planets moved in a uniform circular motion, replacing it with elliptical motion. Also, like Copernicus, he asserted the physical reality of a heliocentric model as opposed to a geocentric one. Yet, despite all of his breakthroughs, Kepler could not explain the physics that would keep a planet in its elliptical orbit.

Kepler's laws of planetary motion 

1. The Law of Ellipses: All planets move in elliptical orbits, with the Sun at one focus.
2. The Law of Equal Areas in Equal Time: A line that connects a planet to the Sun sweeps out equal areas in equal times.
3. The Law of Harmony: The time required for a planet to orbit the Sun, called its period, is proportional to long axis of the ellipse raised to the 3/2 power. The constant of proportionality is the same for all the planets.

Galileo Galilei

Galileo Galilei was an Italian scientist who is sometimes referred to as the "father of modern observational astronomy". His improvements to the telescope, astronomical observations, and support for Copernicanism were all integral to the Copernican Revolution.

Based on the designs of Hans Lippershey, Galileo designed his own telescope which, in the following year, he had improved to 30x magnification. Using this new instrument, Galileo made a number of astronomical observations which he published in the Sidereus Nuncius in 1610. In this book, he described the surface of the Moon as rough, uneven, and imperfect. He also noted that "the boundary dividing the bright from the dark part does not form a uniformly oval line, as would happen in a perfectly spherical solid, but is marked by an uneven, rough, and very sinuous line, as the figure shows." These observations challenged Aristotle's claim that the Moon was a perfect sphere and the larger idea that the heavens were perfect and unchanging.

Galileo's next astronomical discovery would prove to be a surprising one. While observing Jupiter over the course of several days, he noticed four stars close to Jupiter whose positions were changing in a way that would be impossible if they were fixed stars. After much observation, he concluded these four stars were orbiting the planet Jupiter and were in fact moons, not stars. This was a radical discovery because, according to Aristotelian cosmology, all heavenly bodies revolve around the Earth and a planet with moons obviously contradicted that popular belief. While contradicting Aristotelian belief, it supported Copernican cosmology which stated that Earth is a planet like all others.

In 1610, Galileo observed that Venus had a full set of phases, similar to the phases of the moon we can observe from Earth. This was explainable by the Copernican or Tychonic systems which said that all phases of Venus would be visible due to the nature of its orbit around the Sun, unlike the Ptolemaic system which stated only some of Venus's phases would be visible. Due to Galileo's observations of Venus, Ptolemy's system became highly suspect and the majority of leading astronomers subsequently converted to various heliocentric models, making his discovery one of the most influential in the transition from geocentrism to heliocentrism.

Sphere of the fixed stars 

In the sixteenth century, a number of writers inspired by Copernicus, such as Thomas Digges, Giordano Bruno and William Gilbert argued for an indefinitely extended or even infinite universe, with other stars as distant suns. This contrasts with the Aristotelian view of a sphere of the fixed stars. Although opposed by Copernicus and (initially) Kepler, in 1610 Galileo made his telescopic observation of the faint strip of the Milky Way, which he found it resolves in innumerable white star-like spots, presumably farther stars themselves. By the middle of the 17th century this new view became widely accepted, partly due to the support of René Descartes.

Isaac Newton

Newton was a well known English physicist and mathematician who was known for his book Philosophiæ Naturalis Principia Mathematica. He was a main figure in the Scientific Revolution for his laws of motion and universal gravitation. The laws of Newton are said to be the ending point of the Copernican Revolution.

Newton used Kepler's laws of planetary motion to derive his law of universal gravitation. Newton's law of universal gravitation was the first law he developed and proposed in his book Principia. The law states that any two objects exert a gravitational force of attraction on each other. The magnitude of the force is proportional to the product of the gravitational masses of the objects, and inversely proportional to the square of the distance between them. Along with Newton's law of universal gravitation, the Principia also presents his three laws of motion. These three laws explain inertia, acceleration, action and reaction when a net force is applied to an object.

Metaphorical usage

Immanuel Kant

Immanuel Kant in his Critique of Pure Reason (1787 edition) drew a parallel between the "Copernican revolution" and the epistemology of his new transcendental philosophy. Kant's comparison is made in the Preface to the second edition of the Critique of Pure Reason (published in 1787; a heavy revision of the first edition of 1781). Kant argues that, just as Copernicus moved from the supposition of heavenly bodies revolving around a stationary spectator to a moving spectator, so metaphysics, "proceeding precisely on the lines of Copernicus' primary hypothesis", should move from assuming that "knowledge must conform to objects" to the supposition that "objects must conform to our [a priori] knowledge".

Much has been said on what Kant meant by referring to his philosophy as "proceeding precisely on the lines of Copernicus' primary hypothesis". There has been a long-standing discussion on the appropriateness of Kant's analogy because, as most commentators see it, Kant inverted Copernicus' primary move. 
According to Tom Rockmore, Kant himself never used the "Copernican revolution" phrase about himself, though it was "routinely" applied to his work by others.

After Kant

Following Kant, the phrase "Copernican Revolution" in the 20th century came to be used for any (supposed) paradigm shift, for example in reference to Freudian psychoanalysis or continental philosophy and analytic linguistic philosophy.

See also 
 History of science in the Renaissance

Notes

References

Works cited

Gillies, Donald. (2019). Why did the Copernican revolution take place in Europe rather than China?. https://www.researchgate.net/publication/332320835_Why_did_the_Copernican_revolution_take_place_in_Europe_rather_than_China
Gingerich, Owen. "From Copernicus to Kepler: Heliocentrism as Model and as Reality". Proceedings of the American Philosophical Society 117, no. 6 (December 31, 1973): 513–22.
Huff, Toby E. (2017). The Rise of Early Modern Science. Cambridge: Cambridge University Press. .
Huff, Toby E. (Autumn–Winter 2002). "The Rise of Early Modern Science: A Reply to George Sabila". Bulletin of the Royal Institute of Inter-Faith Studies (BRIIFS). 4, 2.

Kuhn, Thomas S. (1970). The Structure of Scientific Revolutions. Chicago: Chicago University Press. .
Kunitzch, Paul. "The Arabic Translations of Ptolemy's Almagest". Qatar Digital Library, July 31, 2018. https://www.qdl.qa/en/arabic-translations-ptolemys-almagest.
Koyré, Alexandre (2008). From the Closed World to the Infinite Universe. Charleston, S.C.: Forgotten Books. .
Lawson, Russell M. Science in the Ancient World: An Encyclopedia. Santa Barbara, CA: ABC-CLIO, 2004.
Lin, Justin Y. (1995). The Needham Puzzle: Why the Industrial Revolution Did Not Originate in China. Economic Development and Cultural Change, 43(2), 269–292. Retrieved from https://www.jstor.org/stable/1154499.
Metzger, Hélène (1932). Histoire des sciences. Revue Philosophique De La France Et De L'Étranger, 114, 143–155. Retrieved from https://www.jstor.org/stable/41086443.

Rushkin, Ilia. "Optimizing the Ptolemaic Model of Planetary and Solar Motion". History and Philosophy of Physics 1 (February 6, 2015): 1–13.
Saliba, George (1979). "The First Non-Ptolemaic Astronomy at the Maraghah School". Isis. 70 (4). ISSN 0021-1753.
Sabila, George (Autumn 1999). "Seeking the Origins of Modern Science?". Bulletin of the Royal Institute for Inter-Faith Studies (BRIIFS). 1, 2.
Sabila, George (Autumn–Winter 2002). "Flying Goats and Other Obsessions: A Response to Toby Huff's "Reply"". Bulletin of the Royal Institute for Inter-Faith Studies (BRIIFS). 4, 2.

Swetz, Frank J. "Mathematical Treasure: Ptolemy's Almagest". Mathematical Treasure: Ptolemy's Almagest | Mathematical Association of America, August 2013. https://www.maa.org/press/periodicals/convergence/mathematical-treasure-ptolemy-s-almagest.

External links

 
History of astronomy
Revolution
Scientific revolution